USS Fantana (SP-71) was a motorboat that served in the United States Navy as a patrol boat from 1917 to 1919.

Fantana was built as a private motorboat of the same name in 1902 at Morris Heights, New York, by the Gas Engine and Power Company and the Charles L. Seabury and Sons Company. The U.S. Navy chartered her in 1917 for World War I service and commissioned her on 17 March 1917 as USS Fantana (SP-71).

Fantana was attached to Squadron 8 for patrol and picket duty on stations assigned in the 5th Naval District.

On 24 November 1918, Fantanas crew was detached. She was towed to Norfolk, Virginia, where on 11 January 1919 she was decommissioned and returned to her owner.

References

NavSource Online: Section Patrol Craft Photo Archive Fantana (SP 71)

Patrol vessels of the United States Navy
World War I patrol vessels of the United States
Ships built in Morris Heights, Bronx
1902 ships